The men's singles tennis event of the 2015 Pan American Games was held from July 10–15 at the Canadian Tennis Centre in Toronto, Canada.

Seeds

Draw

Finals

Top half

Section 1

Section 2

Bottom half

Section 3

Section 4

References

Men's Singles